Ligue Haïtienne (Haitian League), is a Haitian professional league, governed by the Haitian Football Federation, for association football clubs. It is the country's primary football competition and serves as the top division of the Haitian football league system. Contested by 18 clubs, it operates on a system of promotion and relegation with Division 2.

Clubs also compete against continental rivals in the CONCACAF Champions League.

History

Foundation
It was created in 1937 and is headed by the Fédération Haïtienne de Football, the official governing body of football in the country. The champion and runner-up teams of the league's tournaments qualify to participate in the CONCACAF Champions League from the first round of the CFU Club Championship. 20 teams participate in this league and compete for the national title. Racing CH, with 14 national titles, is the most successful club in the league to date.

Clubs

Members for 2020–21
The following 18 clubs compete in the 2020–21 season.

 America des Cayes
 Arcahaie FC
 AS Capoise
 AS Cavaly
 AS Mirebalais
 Baltimore SC
 Cosmopolites SC
 Don Bosco FC
 FC Juventus des Cayes
 FICA
 Ouanaminthe FC
 Racing Club Haïtien
 Racing Gonaïves FC
 Real Hope FA
 Tempête FC
 Triomphe Liancourt FC
 US Rivartibonitienne
 Violette AC

Previous winners
Since 2002 (with the exception of 2012 and 2013), the league has employed a two-stage season with separate champions for both stages, a system found in many Latin American countries. In French-speaking Haiti, "O" stands for Ouverture (opening), corresponding to the Spanish Apertura, and "F" stands for Fermeture or "C" stands for Clôture (closing), corresponding to the Spanish Clausura.

Performance By Club

Top scorers

Media coverage
The Haitian Football Federation has an exclusive broadcasting agreement with French premium pay TV channel, Canal+. The agreement was made official on 7 March 2016, a five-year deal to start at the end of April, 2016. However the financial details are not disclosed. The deal includes coverage and live broadcasts; 15 matches of its choice for the 2016 season as well as interviews before and after each match.

Canal+ Haiti, a subsidiary, offers three packages to view games domestically.

See also
List of football clubs in Haiti

References

External links
League at FIFA
Equipes et clubs de Football at Haiti-Référence 
Club mottos at Haiti-Tempo 

 
1
Haiti
1937 establishments in Haiti
Sports leagues established in 1937